Winton is a historic home located at Clifford, Amherst County, Virginia. It is a two-story, late-Georgian, frame structure with three bays on the main facade, several additions to the rear, and a prominent two-story portico.  It is said to have been built by Colonel Joseph Cabell (1732-1798) in about 1770, who sold Winton to his friend Colonel Samuel Meredith, Jr. in 1779.  He was a close friend of his near neighbor Patrick Henry, and married Patrick's sister, Jane Henry.   Patrick Henry's mother, Sarah Winston Syme Henry, lived at Winton and is buried in the cemetery on the grounds.  In 1967, an anonymous donor gave it to the County of Amherst to be leased to a corporation and run as a country club.

It was listed on the National Register of Historic Places in 1974. It is located in the Clifford-New Glasgow Historic District.

Gallery

References

Houses in Amherst County, Virginia
Houses completed in 1770
Georgian architecture in Virginia
Houses on the National Register of Historic Places in Virginia
National Register of Historic Places in Amherst County, Virginia
Individually listed contributing properties to historic districts on the National Register in Virginia
1770 establishments in Virginia